Craze may refer to:
 Craze, alternative name for fad
 Craziness, alternative name for insanity
 Crazing, a network of fine cracks

People
 DJ Craze (born 1977), Nicaraguan American DJ
 Elizabeth Craze (born 1982), youngest ever heart transplant survivor at time of surgery (1984)
 Galaxy Craze (born 1970), American actress
 Michael Craze (1942-1998), British actor, brother of Peter Craze
 Nathan Craze (born 1986), Welsh professional ice hockey player
 Peter Craze (born 1946), British actor, brother of Michael Craze

Events
 Gin Craze in the first half of the 18th century in Britain
 Tulip craze in the 17th century in the Dutch Republic

See also
 Dance craze, alternative name for fad dance
 Dance Craze, 1981 British documentary film
 Craze, 1974 film starring Jack Palance and Diana Dors
 Crazy (disambiguation)